Krishnamoorthy may refer to:

 Krishnamoorthy (actor) (1963/64–2019), Indian comedian
 K. Krishnamoorthy (1944–2019), Indian politician 
 P. Krishnamoorthy (1943–2020), Indian film art director, production designer and costume designer
 S. S. Krishnamoorthy (born 1959), Indian politician